Bobby Darrell Keck Sr. (born August 29, 1934 - died March 31, 2011) was a NASCAR Grand National Series driver who drove from 1956 to 1964. He was born in Graham, North Carolina.

Career
He qualified in every race in his career except for the 1963 Old Dominion 500. While starting in 20th place on average, he always managed to improve on his starts by finishing in 17th place on average. Keck would earn just more than $11,000 in his NASCAR career and acquire two finishes in the top-five and nineteen finishes in the top ten. Starting at the age of 21, Bobby was a rugged veteran of 29 years of age when he retired from NASCAR.

Bobby Keck heavily favored dirt tracks where a 14th-place finish was typical. Meanwhile, his Achilles heel was at intermediate tracks where a finish of 23rd place was not unusual.

Being a proud Ford driver, Bobby's career was forever intertwined with a Ford vehicle of some kind.

Personal life
Keck was married to Mary Ella Watkins Keck and was the son of Mr. James Edgar Zeck and Mrs. Ella Mae Zachary Keck. He also had children, grandchildren and great-grandchildren.

References

1934 births
2011 deaths
NASCAR drivers
People from Graham, North Carolina